K. Narayanan is an Indian film director, editor, and art director who has worked predominantly in Malayalam cinema. Since his debut in 1953, he has edited more than 200 films across Malayalam and Tamil.

Early life
He was born in Thikkat house at Nandipuram near Trichur in 1933. Kannan Nair and Kalyaniyamma are his parents. As his father was in Indian Railways his childhood was in Madras. He stopped his studies at the 8th standard. Sarojini is his wife.

Film career
Narayanan started his film career by assisting Sankar in 1947. His first independent project was Sadarame, a Kannada film. His first film in Malayalam was Ashadeepam (1953). He is a four time recipient of the Kerala State Film Award for Best Editor.

Filmography

Malayalam

 Aashadeepam (1953)
 Arappavan (1961)
 Tharavaattamma (1966)
 Ramanan (1967)
 Pareeksha (1967)
 Manaswini (1968)
 Kuruthikkalam (1969)
 Kaattukurangu (1969)
 Mooladhanam (1969)
 Kallichellamma (1969)
 Thurakkaatha Vaathil (1970)
 Kalpana (1970)
 Abhayam (1970)
 Ambalapraavu (1970)
 Kaakkathampuraatti (1970)
 Sthree (1970)
 Kalithozhi (1971)
 Raathrivandi (1971)
 Vimochanasamaram (1971)
 Muthassi (1971)
 Siksha (1971)
 Ernakulam Junction (1971)
 Ummaachu (1971)
 Jeevithasamaram (1971)
 Poymukhangal (1973)
 Prethangalude Thaazhvara (1973)
 Kaalachakram (1973)
 Urvasi Bhaarathi (1973)
 Nathoon (1974)
 Ulsavam (1975)
 Chief Guest (1975)
 Malsaram (1975)
 Aalinganam (1976)
 Abhinandanam (1976)
 Rajaankanam (1976)
 Prasaadam (1976)
 Ayalkkaari (1976)
 Anubhavam (1976)
 Hridayame Saakshi (1977)
 Sakhaakkale Munnottu (1977)
 Randu Lokam (1977)
 Innale Innu (1977)
 Akale Aakaasham (1977)
 Rathimanmadhan (1977)
 Aanandam Paramaanandam (1977)
 Anjali (1977)
 Abhinivesham (1977)
 Veedu Oru Swargam (1977)
 Itha Ivide Vare (1977)
 Anthardaaham (1977)
 Aa Nimisham (1977)
Aasheervaadam (1977)
 Oonjaal (1977)
 Angeekaaram (1977)
 Iniyum Puzhayozhukum (1978)
 Vadakakku Oru Hridayam (1978)
 Rathinirvedam (1978)
 Sthree Oru Dukham (1978)
 Njaan Njaan Maathram (1978)
 Avalude Ravukal (1978)
 Nakshathrangale Kaaval (1978)
 Anumodanam (1978)
 Padakkuthira (1978)
 Beena (1978)
 Avalku Maranamilla (1978)
 Ithaa Oru Manushyan (1978)
 Amarsham (1978)
 Ee Manoharatheeram (1978)
 Praarthana (1978)
 Eetta (1978)
 Saayoojyam (1979)
 Itha Oru Theeram (1979)
 Puthiya Velicham (1979)
 Pambaram (1979)
 Kaalam Kaathuninnilla (1979)
 Alaavudeenum Albuthavilakkum (1979)
 Manasaa Vaacha Karmanaa (1979)
 Venalil Oru Mazha (1979)
 Aarattu (1979)
 Jeevitham Oru Gaanam (1979)
 Ezham Kadalinakkare (1979)
 Idimuzhakkam (1980)
 Pavizhamuthu (1980)
 Dooram Arike (1980)
 Makaravilakku (1980)
 Angaadi (1980)
 Lorry (1980)
 Ivar (1980)
 Ambalavilakku (1980)
 Pralayam (1980)
 Karimbana (1980)
 Swantham Enna Padam (1980)
 Naayaattu (1980)
 Kaanthavalayam (1980)
 Aswaradham (1980)
 Meen (1980)
 Hamsageetham (1981)
 Munnettam (1981)
 Thrishna (1981)
 Orikkalkkoodi (1981)
 Sphodanam (1981)
 Ariyappedaatha Rahasyam (1981)
 Kaattukallan (1981)
 Thushaaram (1981)
 Arikkaari Ammu (1981)
 Aakramanam (1981)
 Enthino Pookkunna Pookkal (1982)
 Ina (1982)
 Ethiraalikal (1982)
 Enikkum Oru Divasam (1982)
 Gaanam (1982)
 Ee Naadu (1982)
 Komaram (1982)
 John Jaffer Janardhanan (1982)
 Ahimsa (1982)
 Drohi (1982)
 Veedu (1982)
 Beedikkunjamma (1982)
 Sindoorasandhyaykku Mounam (1982)
 Innallengil Naale (1982)
 Thadaakam (1982)
 Irattimadhuram (1982)
 Aaroodham (1983)
 Deepaaradhana (1983)
 Iniyenkilum (1983)
 Naanayam (1983)
 Rathilayam (1983)
 Kaikeyi (1983)
 Oru Mukham Pala Mukham (1983)
 America America (1983)
 Swapnalokam (1983)
 Uyarangalil (1984)
 Kaanamarayathu (1984)
 Lakshmana Rekha (1984)
 Athiraathram (1984)
 Aalkoottathil Thaniye (1984)
 Ningalil Oru Sthree (1984)
 Aksharangal (1984)
 Adiyozhukkukal (1984)
 Njaan Piranna Naattil (1985)
 Snehicha Kuttathinu (1985)
 Karimbinpoovinakkare (1985)
 Anubandham (1985)
 Angaadikkappurathu (1985)
 Rangam (1985)
 Idanilangal (1985)
 Manaykkale Thatha (1985)
 Adiverukal (1986)
 T. P. Balagopalan M. A. (1986)
 Gandhinagar 2nd Street (1986)
 Avanazhi (1986)
 Vaartha (1986)
 Njaan Kaathorthirikkum (1986)
 Koodanayum Kaattu (1986)
 Abhayam Thedi (1986)
 Aarundivide Chodikkaan (1986)
 Unnikale Oru Kadha Parayaam (1987)
 Adimakal Udamakal (1987)
 Naalkkavala (1987)
 Yaagaagni (1987)
 Sreedharante Onnaam Thirumurivu (1987)
 Kayyethum Doorathu (1987)
 Nadodikkattu (1987)
 Ithrayum Kaalam (1987)
 Ellaavarkkum Nanmakal (1987)
 1921 (1988)
 Abkaari (1988)
 Orkaappurathu (1988)
 Mukthi (1988)
 Anuraagi (1988)
 Ormayil Ennum (1988)
 Douthyam (1989)
 Mrigaya (1989)
 Aksharathettu (1989)
 Arhatha (1990)
 Varthamaanakaalam (1990)
 Nammude Naadu (1990)
 Midhya (1990)
 Sundarimaare Sookshikkuka (1990)
 Bhoomika (1991)
 Neelagiri (1991)
 Inspector Balram (1991)
 Apaaratha (1992)
 Kallanum Policum (1992)
 Oru Kochu Bhoomikulukkam (1992)
 Arthana (1992)
 Jackpot (1993)
 Yaadavam (1993)
 Devaasuram (1993)
 Chukkaan (1994)
 Karma (1995)
 Rajaputhran (1996)
 Anubhoothi (1997)
 Varnapakittu (1997)
 Unnimaaya (2000)
 Thaniye (2007)
 Muttayi Kallanum Mammaaliyum (2015)

Tamil

 Sivagangai Seemai (1959)
 Paadha Kaanikkai (1962)
 Panathottam (1963)
 Ezhai Pangalan (1963)
 Andavan Kattalai (1964)
 Anbu Karangal (1965)
 Gowri Kalyanam (1966)
 Arasa Kattalai (1967)
 Kudiyirundha Koyil (1968)
 Kallum Kaniyagum (1968)
 Maattukara Velan (1970)
 Naan Yen Pirandhen (1972)
 Annamitta Kai (1972)
 Pattampoochi (1975)
 Kuppathu Raja (1979)
 Allaudinaum Arputha Vilakkum (1979)
 Ore Vaanam Ore Bhoomi (1979)
 Pagalil Oru Iravu (1979)
 Thisai Maariya Paravaigal (1979)
 Kaali (1980)
 Guru (1980)
 Illam (1988)
 Kolangal (1995)

Direction

Kaalachakram	(1973)	
Nathoon	(1974)	
Malsaram	(1975)	
Sundarimare Sookshikkuka	(1990)

Art director
 Ragam (1975)
 Johny (1993)

References

1933 births
Living people
Malayalam film editors
Tamil film editors
Kerala State Film Award winners
Film editors from Kerala
Tamil film directors
Malayalam film directors
20th-century Indian film directors
21st-century Indian film directors
Film directors from Thrissur